Tim Uppal  (born November 14, 1974) is a Indo-Canadian politician, banker, and radio host who is the member for Edmonton Mill Woods in the Parliament of Canada. He served as the Conservative Member of Parliament for Edmonton—Sherwood Park from 2008 to 2015. On July 15, 2013, Uppal was moved from Minister of State for Democratic Reform to the portfolio of Minister of State (Multiculturalism).

Uppal's riding was dismantled ahead of the 2015 election, and he opted to transfer to the newly created riding of Edmonton Mill Woods. He lost to Liberal candidate Amarjeet Sohi, but won the seat from Sohi in the 2019 election. He was re-elected in 2021.

Early life 
Uppal was born on November 14, 1974 in New Westminster, British Columbia and was raised in Edmonton, Alberta. His family were Sikhs who emigrated from Punjab, India. From 1992 to 1997, he was executive producer and host of a radio show on CKER in Edmonton. In 2004, he became a residential mortgage manager at TD Canada Trust. He is the founder and president of the South Edmonton Youth Group and has been a member of the Capital Health, Community Health Council since 2001. For several years Uppal was an active member of the Sherwood Park Chamber of Commerce and the Sherwood Park Rotary Club. He was also a founding member of the Edmonton Police Community Advisory Council.

Member of Parliament 
In the 2000 federal election, Uppal ran for the Canadian Alliance in the riding of Edmonton Southeast, where he lost by fewer than 5,000 votes. In the 2004 federal election, he was defeated again, but only by 134 votes. And in the 2008 federal election, Uppal won the riding of Edmonton-Sherwood Park, becoming Member of Parliament for the Alberta riding.

In December 2008, Uppal was appointed to the Standing Committee on Health and the Standing Committee on Heritage. He was promoted to acting chair of the Health Committee in 2010.

Social Issues

Abortion 
Uppal voted in support of Bill C-233 - An Act to amend the Criminal Code (sex-selective abortion), which would make it a criminal offence for a medical practitioner to knowingly perform an abortion solely on the grounds of the child's genetic sex.

Private Member's Bill 
Uppal introduced his first private member's bill in 2010. The National Holocaust Monument Act (Bill C-442) seeks to establish a national Holocaust monument in Canada. Speaking in the House of Commons, Uppal noted that Canada was the only allied nation without a National Holocaust Memorial. Bill C-442 was passed in the House of Commons with unanimous support from all parties. The bill received Royal Assent in March 2011. The National Holocaust Monument was officially unveiled in Ottawa on September 27, 2017.

Minister of State (Democratic Reform) 
In 2011, Uppal was appointed Minister of State (Democratic Reform). Uppal is the first Turban-wearing Sikh to be appointed to the Canadian Cabinet, one of five Visible Minorities serving as Ministers in the Harper government. During his time as Minister of State for Democratic Reform, Uppal focused on the issue of over-populated constituencies and redistribution of federal riding borders.

Minister of State (Multiculturalism) 
In July 2013, in a cabinet reshuffle, Uppal was appointed Minister of State (Multiculturalism).

Electoral record

References

External links 
Tim Uppal official site

1974 births
Living people
Canadian people of Indian descent
Canadian people of Punjabi descent
Canadian Sikhs
Canadian bankers
Conservative Party of Canada MPs
Members of the House of Commons of Canada from Alberta
Members of the King's Privy Council for Canada
People from New Westminster
Politicians from Edmonton
Members of the 28th Canadian Ministry
Canadian politicians of Indian descent
Canadian politicians of Punjabi descent
Deputy opposition leaders